Late Modernism: Art, Culture, and Politics in Cold War America is a 2010 intellectual history book by Robert Genter. The author analyzes the history of thought in the postwar United States through prominent scholars, from literary critics and painters to sociologists and public intellectuals.

Bibliography

External links 

 

2010 non-fiction books
English-language books
Intellectual history
Art history books
Aesthetics books
History books about the United States
Cultural history of the United States
University of Pennsylvania Press books